Mariano da Alcamo (1555? – 27 July 1621) was an Italian Catholic presbyter.

Biography 
He was born in Alcamo in the (province of Trapani), between 1555 and 1560, as his parents (Niccolò Bonafino from Savoca (in the province of Messina), and  Caterina Russo, had married in 1554.

He started his religious life with the Capuchines in the  province of Palermo, and after he became a priest, he went on studying to become a preacher but in  1591 he was chosen as the provincial Father. At the end of his  office he asked to leave for the missions and so in 1599 he left with  Lawrence of Brindisi for Bohemia and Persia where Protestant doctrines were very widespread, in order to preach the Gospel of Jesus Christ and defeat heresies.

There are few anecdotes proving his reputation for holiness which spread at his coming back to Sicily, while from his Latin letters sent to his friend and schoolmate Sebastiano Bagolino, we learn that the mission was successfully proceeding, thanks to the collaboration given by the emperor Rudolf II, Holy Roman Emperor, and that he was completing a collection of sermons with the title In orationem Dominicam seu Mare oceanum concionatorum pauperum.

In Sicily Mariano worked for the diffusion of the devotion to the Virgin Mary. This veneration for the Virgin Mary was reinforced by his certainty that he had got some graces (he thought he had been released from temptations and dangers), and by the vision of Our Lady of Stellario which he said he had once had in the friary of Alcamo after his return from Bohemia. 

After this vision there were other events believed supernatural, among which was his prediction of the healing of a noblewoman from Alcamo and her daughter’s death, provoked by the same disease.

In 1608, after he settled in the  Capuchin province of Palermo, he had a certain reputation for holiness:  for some months he daily preached in Palermo cathedral  and then he went to Trapani, where there was the viceroy marquess Juan Fernández Pacheco de Vigliena, who he was asked to pray for, and to preach for another period of time in Sanctuary of Maria Santissima Annunziata of Trapani.

When the provincial Father Gianmaria from Castelvetrano died, in 1611, he was nominated  provincial vicar and then  qualificator of the Congregation for the Doctrine of the Faith, guardian of the friaries of Trapani (1614) and Marsala (1615). He died in Palermo on 27 July 1621.

Works 
The most important part of his works is in his manuscripts:

 In orationem Dominicam, quae mare oceanum Concionarum Pauperum nuncupatur, Tom.3, in folio. A collection of sermons 
 Elucidatio in primam partem Divi Thomae, completed in  1612 
 Quaresimale, after his death it was missing between the friaries of Genoa and Palermo and later lost together with his portrait and  a picture of ‘’Our Lady with Stellario’’ that had been painted by him.
In order to promote the devotion for Our Lady with Stellario he published a series of devotional books (prose and poetic works)
 Modus contemplandi coronam beatissimae Virginis Mariae (Palermo 1608), tradotto in italiano dal sacerdote Michele Caruso. 
 Poemata varia et devotissima in laudem beatissimae Virginis Mariae (1613)  
 Plures palmulae in folio et alia diversa opuscula carmine et prosa (both edited in Palermo nel 1612) 
 Officium parvum stellari gaudiosi, dolorosi et gloriosi beatissimae Virginis Mariae (1615)  
 Labyrinthus beatissimae Virginis Mariae (1615).

See also 
 Order of Friars Minor Capuchin
 Missionaries
 Lorenzo da Brindisi
 Institute of consecrated life
 Mendicant orders

References

Sources 
Busolini Dario:  Dizionario Biografico degli Italiani volume 70; editore Treccani, 2008 
Mazzuchelli G.:  Gli scrittori d’Italia pp. 352 s.; città=Brescia, I edizione, 1753 
da Cesinale Rocco: Storia delle missioni dei cappuccini pp. 635 s.; tip.Barbera, Roma, II ed.,1872
F. M. Mirabella: Cenni degli alcamesi rinomati in scienze, lettere, arti, armi e santità; tip.Surdi & C.|, Alcamo
Mirabella  F.M.: Una lettera del p. M. Bonofino da A.; ediz.IX,1884 
Tommaso Papa: Memorie storiche del clero di Alcamo; ediz.Accademia di studi Cielo d'Alcamo, Alcamo, 1968
Nicotra  F.: Diz. illustrato dei Comuni siciliani;  Società editrice del Dizionario illustrato dei Comunisiciliani pp. 198; Palermo, I ediz., 1907-1908
da Castellammare Antonino: Storia dei minori cappuccini della provincia di Palermo pp. 343–353; Palermo, II ediz., 1922
Egidio da Modica F.: Catalogo degli scrittori cappuccini della provincia di Palermo pp. 107–109; Palermo, 1930
von Oberleutasch C. Die Kapuziner in Österreich zum 350jährigen Bestand der Wiener Kapuzinerprovinz (1600-1650) p. 264; ed. Lexicon Capuccinum, Roma, 1951
a Pobladura  Melchior  De cooperatoribus in compositione annalium Ordinis fratrum minorum Capuccinorum pp. 22, 41; ediz. in Collectanea Franciscana, XXVI, 1956
Papa T.: Memorie storiche del clero di Alcamo pp. 57, 64 s.; Alcamo, 1968 
Kusin E.:  Die Anfänge des Kapuzinerordens in Erzherzogtume Österreich unter und ob der Enns (1600-1630)3-4, p. 249; ed. in Collectanea Franciscana, XXXIX, 1969

External links 
https://books.google.it/books?id=6Ig7AAAAcAAJ&pg=PT102&lpg=PT102&dq=maca+alcamo&source=bl&ots=kNWxMujBNR&sig=1oH9u2XUIiILgNdn8pC2DJNZpug&hl=it&sa=X&ved=0ahUKEwjH9pGRl73QAhVG0xoKHT6oBfs4FBDoAQhSMAg#v=onepage&q=maca%20alcamo&f=false
 http://www.treccani.it/enciclopedia/mariano-da-alcamo_(Dizionario-Biografico)/

People from Alcamo
Italian Roman Catholic missionaries
1621 deaths
16th-century Italian Roman Catholic priests
Year of birth uncertain
Roman Catholic missionaries in Italy
Roman Catholic missionaries in the Czech Republic
17th-century Italian Roman Catholic priests